Schneppenbach is a river of Bavaria, Germany. It is a right tributary of the Westerbach near Schöllkrippen.

Name 
The name Schneppenbach comes from the old words sneppen and bach , which means faster brook. The brook gave the place Schneppenbach its name.

See also
List of rivers of Bavaria

References 

Rivers of Bavaria
Rivers of Germany